A tournament is a form of organized competition.

Tournament may also refer to:

 Tournament (medieval), a chivalrous competition of the Middle Ages
 Tournament (solitaire), a solitaire card game
 Tournament (graph theory), a kind of directed graph

Media 
 The Tournament (TV series), a 2005–06 Canadian TV show
 The Tournament (Clarke novel), a 2002 novel by Australian writer John Clarke
 The Tournament (Reilly novel), a 2013 novel by Australian writer Matthew Reilly
 The Tournament (Révoil), an 1812 painting by Pierre Révoil
 Speedball 2: Tournament, a 2007 videogame

Films
 The Tournament (1974 film) (Cantonese: Chung taai kuen taan sang sei chin), a Hong Kong film featuring Yuen Wah
 The Tournament (2009 film), an action film starring Robert Carlyle
 Tournament – Play & Replay, a 2010 Malayalam-language film
 The Tournament (2015 film), a 2015 French film

Other uses
 Tournament Park, Pasadena, California, USA; a park

See also

 La Tourney, Saint Lucia; a town
 Tournament sort, a sorting algorithm
 Tournament selection, a selection algorithm
 Royal Tournament, a 20th century British military tattoo
 
 
 
 Tournament of Champions (disambiguation)